The meridian 131° east of Greenwich is a line of longitude that extends from the North Pole across the Arctic Ocean, Asia, Australia, the Indian Ocean, the Southern Ocean, and Antarctica to the South Pole.

The 131st meridian east forms a great circle with the 49th meridian west.

From Pole to Pole
Starting at the North Pole and heading south to the South Pole, the 131st meridian east passes through:

{| class="wikitable plainrowheaders"
! scope="col" width="130" | Co-ordinates
! scope="col" | Country, territory or sea
! scope="col" | Notes
|-
| style="background:#b0e0e6;" | 
! scope="row" style="background:#b0e0e6;" | Arctic Ocean
| style="background:#b0e0e6;" |
|-
| style="background:#b0e0e6;" | 
! scope="row" style="background:#b0e0e6;" | Laptev Sea
| style="background:#b0e0e6;" |
|-valign="top"
| 
! scope="row" | 
| Sakha Republic Khabarovsk Krai — from  Amur Oblast — from  Khabarovsk Krai — from  Amur Oblast — from  Khabarovsk Krai — from  Amur Oblast — from  Jewish Autonomous Oblast — from 
|-valign="top"
| 
! scope="row" | 
| Heilongjiang
|-
| 
! scope="row" | 
| Primorsky Krai — for about 
|-valign="top"
| 
! scope="row" | 
| Heilongjiang  Jilin — from 
|-
| 
! scope="row" | 
| Primorsky Krai
|-valign="top"
| style="background:#b0e0e6;" | 
! scope="row" style="background:#b0e0e6;" | Sea of Japan
| style="background:#b0e0e6;" | Passing just east of the island of Ulleungdo,  (at ) Passing just west of the island of Mishima, Yamaguchi Prefecture,  (at )
|-
| 
! scope="row" | 
| Island of Honshū, Yamaguchi Prefecture (passing through Chōfu station in eastern Shimonoseki)
|-
| style="background:#b0e0e6;" | 
! scope="row" style="background:#b0e0e6;" | Kanmon Straits
| style="background:#b0e0e6;" |
|-valign="top"
| 
! scope="row" | 
| Island of Kyūshū— Fukuoka Prefecture— Ōita Prefecture — from — Kumamoto Prefecture — from — Ōita Prefecture — from — Kumamoto Prefecture — from — Miyazaki Prefecture — from — Kagoshima Prefecture — from 
|-
| style="background:#b0e0e6;" | 
! scope="row" style="background:#b0e0e6;" | East China Sea
| style="background:#b0e0e6;" |
|-
| 
! scope="row" | 
| Island of Tanegashima, Kagoshima Prefecture
|-valign="top"
| style="background:#b0e0e6;" | 
! scope="row" style="background:#b0e0e6;" | Pacific Ocean
| style="background:#b0e0e6;" | Passing just west of the island of Minami Daitō, Okinawa Prefecture,  (at ) Passing just west of the island of Oki Daitō, Okinawa Prefecture,  (at ) Passing just west of the island of Tobi,  (at ) Passing just west of the Asia Islands,  (at ) Passing just west of the Ayu Islands,  (at )
|-
| 
! scope="row" | 
| Island of Waigeo
|-
| style="background:#b0e0e6;" | 
! scope="row" style="background:#b0e0e6;" | Dampier Strait
| style="background:#b0e0e6;" |
|-
| 
! scope="row" | 
| Islands of Salawati and New Guinea
|-
| style="background:#b0e0e6;" | 
! scope="row" style="background:#b0e0e6;" | Ceram Sea
| style="background:#b0e0e6;" | Passing just east of the island of Seram,  (at )
|-
| style="background:#b0e0e6;" | 
! scope="row" style="background:#b0e0e6;" | Banda Sea
| style="background:#b0e0e6;" |
|-
| 
! scope="row" | 
| Island of Wuliaru
|-
| style="background:#b0e0e6;" | 
! scope="row" style="background:#b0e0e6;" | Banda Sea
| style="background:#b0e0e6;" |
|-
| 
! scope="row" | 
| Island of Seira
|-
| style="background:#b0e0e6;" | 
! scope="row" style="background:#b0e0e6;" | Banda Sea
| style="background:#b0e0e6;" |
|-
| 
! scope="row" | 
| Island of Selaru
|-
| style="background:#b0e0e6;" | 
! scope="row" style="background:#b0e0e6;" | Arafura Sea
| style="background:#b0e0e6;" |
|-
| style="background:#b0e0e6;" | 
! scope="row" style="background:#b0e0e6;" | Timor Sea
| style="background:#b0e0e6;" |
|-
| 
! scope="row" | 
| Northern Territory — Melville Island
|-
| style="background:#b0e0e6;" | 
! scope="row" style="background:#b0e0e6;" | Clarence Strait
| style="background:#b0e0e6;" |
|-valign="top"
| 
! scope="row" | 
| Northern Territory South Australia — from 
|-
| style="background:#b0e0e6;" | 
! scope="row" style="background:#b0e0e6;" | Indian Ocean
| style="background:#b0e0e6;" | Australian authorities consider this to be part of the Southern Ocean
|-
| style="background:#b0e0e6;" | 
! scope="row" style="background:#b0e0e6;" | Southern Ocean
| style="background:#b0e0e6;" |
|-
| 
! scope="row" | Antarctica
| Australian Antarctic Territory, claimed by 
|-
|}

See also
130th meridian east
132nd meridian east

References

e131 meridian east